Hussey is a surname. The surname is common in the British Isles, as well as locations associated with settlement by the people of these regions. The name has two main sources of origin. The first is of Norman origin, coming from the region of La Houssaye in Northern France. In Old French, the name relates to holly ('hous' in Old French). Hussey also has an Irish origin, stemming from the Ó hEodhasa family.

Notable people 
 Anna Maria Hussey (1805–1853), British mycologist, writer, and illustrator
 Arthur Hussey (1882–1915), American Olympic golfer
 Charles Henry Hussey (1832–1899), South Australia politician
 Charlotte Hussey (fl 1990), Canadian poet
 Chris Hussey (born 1989), English professional footballer
 Christopher Hussey (1899–1970), British architectural historian
 Cornelia Collins Hussey (1827–1902), American philanthropist, writer
 Curtis Hussey (born 1983), American professional wrestler
 David Hussey (born 1977), Australian cricketer
 Dyneley Hussey (1893–1972), British war poet and music critic
 Edward Hussey, various people, including
Sir Edward Hussey, 1st Baronet (1585–1648), English politician
Sir Edward Hussey, 3rd Baronet (c. 1662–1725), MP for Lincoln
Edward Hussey-Montagu, 1st Earl Beaulieu (1721–1802), British peer and politician
Edward Hussey (cricketer) (1749–1816), English cricketer and landowner
 Erastus Hussey (1800–1889), American abolitionist
 Frank Hussey (1905–1974), American athlete
 Gemma Hussey (born 1938), Irish politician
 George Frederick Hussey (1852–1935), South Australia politician
 Henry Hussey (disambiguation), various people, including
Henry Hussey, 1st Baron Hussey (1265–1332), English soldier and politician
Henry Hussey, 2nd Baron Hussey (1292–1349), English nobleman
Baron Hussey, other nobles, including:
Henry Hussey, 3rd Baron Hussey (died 1349) 
Henry Hussey, 4th Baron Hussey (died 1384)
Henry Hussey, 5th Baron Hussey (1362–1409)
Henry Hussey, 6th Baron Hussey (died 1460)
Henry Hussey (1361-1409), MP for Sussex (UK Parliament constituency)
Henry Hussey (died 1557), MP for New Shoreham, Lewes, Gatton and Horsham
Henry Hussey (fl. 1529) (died 1541/44), MP for Horsham, England
Henry Hussey (pastor) (1825–1903), printer, preacher and author in South Australia
 Joan M. Hussey (1907–2006), British historian
 John Brennan Hussey (born 1934), mayor of Shreveport, Louisiana 
 Laurence Hussey (active 1550–1570), English lawyer and diplomat
 M. A. C. Hussey Mississippi State Representative 1876-77
 Marc Hussey (born 1974), Canadian ice hockey player 
 Marcela Hussey (born 1967), Argentine field hockey player 
 Marmaduke Hussey, Baron Hussey of North Bradley (1923–2006), BBC Chairman
 Mary Dudley Hussey (1853-1927), American lawyer, physician, and suffragist
 Matt Hussey (born 1979), American ice hockey player
 Michael Hussey (born 1975), Australian cricketer
Natalia Hussey-Burdick (born 1989), American politician, Member of the Hawaii State House of Representatives
 Obed Hussey (1790–1860), American inventor
 Olivia Hussey (born 1951), Argentine-British actress
 Percival Hussey (1869–1944), Australian cricketer
 Richard Charles Hussey (1806–1887), British architect
 Ruth Hussey (1911–2005), American actress
 Susan Hussey, Baroness Hussey of North Bradley (born 1939), Woman of the Bedchamber to Queen Elizabeth II
 Thomas Hussey (disambiguation), various people, including
 Thomas Hussey (MP for Dorchester) (fl. 1395), English MP
 Thomas Hussey (died 1558) (by 1509–1558), MP for Great Grimsby, Grantham and Lincolnshire
 Thomas Hussey (died by 1576) (c. 1520–by 1576), English MP
 Thomas Hussey (died 1468), MP for Weymouth and Melcombe Regis, Great Bedwyn, Old Sarum and Dorset
 Sir Thomas Hussey, 2nd Baronet (1639–1706), English MP
 Thomas Hussey (Aylesbury MP) (1749–1824), English MP
 Thomas Hussey (Grantham MP) (died 1641), Royalist MP for Grantham, 1640–1641
 Thomas Hussey (Lyme Regis MP) (1814–1894), British MP for Lyme Regis, 1842–1847
 Thomas Hussey (MP for Whitchurch) (1597–1657), English merchant and MP at various times between 1645 and 1657
 Thomas Hussey (Irish politician) (born 1936), Fianna Fáil politician from County Galway in Ireland
 Thomas Hussey (bishop) (1746–1803), Irish diplomat, chaplain and bishop
 Thomas John Hussey (1792–c. 1854), English clergyman and astronomer
 Tom Hussey (1910–1982), Major League Baseball announcer
 Tom Hussey (photographer), American photographer
 Walter Hussey (1909–1985), British clergyman and patron of the arts
 Wayne Hussey (born 1958), British guitarist
 William Hussey (disambiguation), various people, including
 William Hussey (died ?1531) (died 1531), MP for Stamford
 William Hussey (died 1556), MP for Grantham
 William Hussey (died 1570) (1524–1570), MP for Scarborough
 William Hussey (English diplomat) (1642–1691), English ambassador to the Ottoman Empire
 William Hussey (died 1813) (1725–1813), MP for Hindon, Salisbury and St Germans
 William Hussey (astronomer) (1862–1926), American astronomer
 William Hussey (judge) (1443–1495), English Chief Justice
 William Hussey (writer), English children's author
 William Clive Hussey (1858–1923), British Army officer

See also
 Hussey (crater), crater on Mars
 Hussie, author and artist, notably creator of Homestuck

References